Yerko Andrés Urra Cortés (born 9 July 1996) is a Chilean footballer who plays for Deportes Temuco.

References

1996 births
Living people
Chilean footballers
Chilean Primera División players
Primera B de Chile players
C.D. Huachipato footballers
Deportes Temuco footballers
Association football goalkeepers
2019 Copa América players
People from Bío Bío Province